Jinzhong College (晋中学院) is a college in Shanxi, China under the authority of the provincial government.  It is on Wenyuan Road in Yuci district.  It has several campuses.  It was formerly established as a junior college level normal school in 1958 during The Great Leap Forward.

Universities and colleges in Shanxi